Diede de Groot and Lucy Shuker defeated Louise Hunt and Dana Mathewson in the final, 6–3, 4–6, 6–4 to win the women's title at the 2016 Wheelchair Doubles Masters.

Jiske Griffioen and Aniek van Koot were the reigning champions, but did not compete.

Seeds

  Diede de Groot /  Lucy Shuker (champions)
  Katharina Krüger /  Michaela Spaanstra (semifinals)
  Louise Hunt /  Dana Mathewson (final)
  Giulia Capocci /  Marianna Lauro (round robin)
  Charlotte Famin /  Emmy Kaiser (semifinals)
  Angelica Bernal /  Francisca Mardones (round robin)

Draw

Finals

Group A

Group B

References

External links

Women's doubles draw

Masters, 2016